Calichodes is a genus of moths in the family Geometridae.

Species
 Calichodes difoveata (Wehrli, 1943)
 Calichodes subrugata (Walker, 1862)

References
 Calichodes at Markku Savela's Lepidoptera and Some Other Life Forms
 Natural History Museum Lepidoptera genus database

Boarmiini